Fremont Township may refer to:

California
 Fremont Township, Santa Clara County, California, in Santa Clara County, California, defunct
 Fremont Township, Solano County, California

Illinois 
 Fremont Township, Lake County, Illinois

Indiana 
 Fremont Township, Steuben County, Indiana

Iowa 
 Fremont Township, Benton County, Iowa
 Fremont Township, Bremer County, Iowa
 Fremont Township, Buchanan County, Iowa
 Fremont Township, Butler County, Iowa
 Fremont Township, Cedar County, Iowa
 Fremont Township, Clarke County, Iowa
 Fremont Township, Fayette County, Iowa
 Fremont Township, Hamilton County, Iowa
 Fremont Township, Johnson County, Iowa
 Fremont Township, Page County, Iowa
 Fremont Township, Winneshiek County, Iowa

Kansas 
 Fremont Township, Lyon County, Kansas

Michigan 
 Fremont Township, Isabella County, Michigan
 Fremont Township, Saginaw County, Michigan
 Fremont Township, Sanilac County, Michigan
 Fremont Township, Tuscola County, Michigan

Minnesota 
 Fremont Township, Winona County, Minnesota

Township name disambiguation pages